The 2009-10 Montreal Carabins women's ice hockey season was their first season competing in the Canadian Interuniversity Sport (CIS). Their 13-6-1 conference record ranked second during the QSSF regular season. Overall, the Carabins had a won loss record of 15 wins, nine losses, and one tie. In their first season in the CIS, the Carabins qualified for the CIS National Championship tournament.

Conference standings

Schedule

Player stats

Awards and honors
Kim Deschênes Forward, QSSF 1st all-star team
Marie-Hélène Suc Defence, QSSF 1st all-star team
Marie-Andrée Leclerc-Auger Forward, QSSF 2nd all-star team
Kim Deschênes, QSSF Rookie of the year

See also
2010–11 Montreal Carabins women's ice hockey season
Montreal Carabins
Canadian Interuniversity Sport women's ice hockey championship

References

External links
 Official Website of Montreal Carabins women's ice hockey

Montreal Carabins
Mon
Montreal Carabins women's ice hockey